João Paulo Ferreira Lourenço (born 7 September 1997), simply known as Lourenço is a Brazilian footballer who plays for CSA, as a winger.

Club career
Born in Belo Horizonte, Lourenço graduated from the youth academy of Avaí. On 19 March 2017, he made his first team debut in a 4–1 defeat against Metropolitano. On 20 November, he scored his first professional goal for the club in a 2–1 league victory against Palmeiras.

On 17 March 2018, Lourenço scored the winning goal in a 1–0 victory against Fluminense in Copa do Brasil.

Club statistics

Honours
Avaí
Campeonato Catarinense: 2019

References

External links
Avaí Futebol Clube profile

1997 births
Living people
Footballers from Belo Horizonte
Brazilian footballers
Association football forwards
Campeonato Brasileiro Série A players
Campeonato Brasileiro Série B players
Campeonato Brasileiro Série C players
Avaí FC players
Santa Cruz Futebol Clube players
Centro Sportivo Alagoano players